Zenas Leonard (March 19, 1809 – July 14, 1857) was an American mountain man, explorer and trader, known for his journal Narrative of the Adventures of Zenas Leonard.
Leonard was born in Clearfield County, Pennsylvania.  As a young adult, he worked for his uncle in Pittsburgh before moving to St. Louis and working as a clerk for the fur company, Gannt and Blackwell.

In 1831 he went with Gannt and Blackwell's company of about 70 men on a trapping and trading expedition. Living off the land (Leonard reported that "The flesh of the Buffaloe is the wholesomest and most palatable of meat kind"), Leonard and his associates endured great privation while amassing a fortune in furs; the horses died in the harsh winter and the party was at times near starvation. They survived, in part, by trading with Native Americans. Among the more helpful tribal members he reported encountering was a negro who claimed to have been on Lewis & Clark's expedition, and who may have been the explorer-slave York. In 1835 Leonard returned to Independence, Missouri, with enough wealth in furs to establish a store and trading post at Fort Osage. He continued to trade along the river for the rest of his life.

Leonard's journal was published in book form by D.W. Moore of Clearfield, Pennsylvania, in 1839, after being serialized in the Clearfield Republican. It includes many details of the different tribes with which his parties interacted. As it is in the public domain, there are numerous reprints.

See also 
 Wildcat Bill

References

1809 births
1857 deaths
People from Clearfield County, Pennsylvania
Mountain men
18th-century American non-fiction writers
Autobiographers
American fur traders